The Kamp Ranch Limestone is a geologic formation in Dallas County, Texas. It preserves fossils dating back to the Cretaceous period. The most notable is Dallasaurus, a squamate that was the first of the aquatic mosasaurs.

See also

 List of fossiliferous stratigraphic units in Texas
 Paleontology in Texas

References
 

Limestone formations of the United States
Cretaceous geology of Texas